Valley Township, Nebraska may refer to the following places:

Valley Township, Buffalo County, Nebraska
Valley Township, Knox County, Nebraska

See also
 Green Valley Township, Holt County, Nebraska
 Pleasant Valley Township, Dodge County, Nebraska
 Valley Township (disambiguation)

Nebraska township disambiguation pages